Francine Sandra Rivers (born 1947) is an American author of fiction with Christian themes, including inspirational romance novels.  Prior to becoming a born-again Christian in 1986, Rivers wrote historical romance novels. She is best known for her inspirational novel Redeeming Love, while another novel, The Last Sin Eater, received its own film adaptation released in 2007 by Fox Faith. A film based on Redeeming Love was released on January 21, 2022 through Pinnacle Peak Pictures and Universal Pictures.

Biography

Early years
Francine Rivers is the daughter of a police officer and a nurse.  From the time she was a child, Rivers wanted to be a published author. She attended Amador Valley High School in Pleasanton, CA. She attended the University of Nevada, Reno, where she graduated with a Bachelor of Arts degree in English and journalism. After her graduation she spent time as a newspaper reporter, writing obituaries and human interest stories.

Career
After her mother-in-law lent her several romance novels, Rivers decided that she would try to write in that genre. Her first manuscript was sold and became published in 1976. For the next several years she wrote historical romance novels.

In 1986, Rivers became a born-again Christian, and for three years she had difficulty finding plots for new novels. She spent her time instead studying the Bible, and decided to adapt her writing to focus on more Christian themes. Her first novel in the new vein, Redeeming Love, was released in 1991. Rivers considers it to be her statement of faith. Redeeming Love updates the Old Testament book of Hosea to the American West of the 1850s and tells the story of a prostitute named Angel, who is eventually reformed and converted to Christianity by the stoic patience and love of a frontier farmer named Michael Hosea.

Rivers' subsequent novels have all been in the inspirational fiction genre, as Rivers wants to "illustrate Christ and the Christian walk, to address difficult problems and write realistic stories."  In a letter on her webpage
 Francine Rivers refers to the books written before her conversion to Christianity as her "B.C." (before Christ) bibliography.  She has purchased the publication rights to her earlier romance novels so that she can prevent them from being released again, but some titles have been rereleased and others circulate in used bookstores.

Her inspirational series, The Mark of the Lion, sold over half a million copies.  In 2007, her novel The Last Sin Eater was made into a feature film, directed by Michael Landon Jr. and distributed by Fox Faith.

Rivers has been honored with many awards, including the Christy Award, the ECPA Gold Medallion, and the Holt Medallion.  Rivers is also a member of the Romance Writers of America's Hall of Fame.  She has won four RWA RITA Awards, the highest award given in romantic fiction. Her first RITA was for Best Historical Romance in 1986 for Not So Wild a Dream.  Her subsequent ones, in 1995, 1996, and 1997, have been for Best Inspirational Romance.

She executive produced and wrote the script for the upcoming film adaptation of her novel, Redeeming Love, which is set to debut in theaters in 2021.

Personal life
Francine Rivers is married to Rick Rivers and they live together in northern California (where the action in many of her contemporary novels is set). They have three children: Trevor, Shannon, and Travis; and five grandchildren.

Film adaptations

The Last Sin Eater

In 2007, a film adaptation of The Last Sin Eater directed by Michael Landon Jr. was released by Fox Faith.

Redeeming Love

A film adaptation based on Rivers' bestselling novel Redeeming Love was announced in early 2020, with D.J. Caruso directing and Pure Flix Entertainment and Lightworkers Media producing.

Bibliography

Christian–inspirational romance novels
Redeeming Love (1991)
Mark of the Lion Series: (1993–1995)
A Voice in the Wind (1993)
An Echo in the Darkness (1994)
As Sure as the Dawn (1995)
The Scarlet Thread (1996)
The Atonement Child (1997)
The Last Sin Eater (1998)
Leota's Garden (1999)
The Shoe Box (1999)
Lineage of Grace Series: (2000–2001)
Unveiled (2000)
Unashamed (2000)
Unshaken (2001)
Unspoken (2001)
Unafraid (2001)
And the Shofar Blew (2003)
Sons of Encouragement Series: (2004–2007)
The Priest (2004)
The Warrior (2005)
The Prince (2005)
The Prophet (2006)
The Scribe (2007)
Bible Stories for Growing Kids (2007) (Written together with daughter Shannon Rivers Coibion)
Marta's Legacy Series: (2010)
Her Mother's Hope (March 2010)
Her Daughter's Dream (September 2010)
Bridge to Haven (2014)
The Masterpiece (2018)

Romance novels (B.C. bibliography)
Kathleen (1979)
Sycamore Hill (1981)
Rebel In His Arms (1982)
This Golden Valley (1983)
Sarina (1983)
Not So Wild a Dream (1985)
Outlaw's Embrace (1986)
A Fire in the Heart (1987)
Second Chance at Love Series
Hearts Divided (1983)
Heart in Hiding (1984)
Pagan Heart (1985)

References

External links
An autobiographical essay by Francine Rivers describing her conversion: 

1947 births
Living people
20th-century American novelists
21st-century American novelists
American romantic fiction writers
American women novelists
Christian novelists
RITA Award winners
Women romantic fiction writers
20th-century American women writers
21st-century American women writers
Converts to Christianity